is a Japanese sweetened probiotic milk beverage fermented with the bacteria strain Lacticaseibacillus casei Shirota. It is sold by Yakult Honsha, based in Tokyo. It is distributed through convenience stores and supermarkets in single-serving containers of (depending on the manufacturer)
The name "Yakult" was coined from jahurto, an Esperanto word meaning "yogurt".

Ingredients 
Yakult's ingredients are water, skimmed  milk, glucose-fructose syrup, sucrose, natural flavors (citrus), and live Lacticaseibacillus casei Shirota bacteria. The strain was originally classified as being Lactobacillus casei.

Yakult is prepared by adding glucose to skimmed milk and heating the mixture at 90 to 95 °C for about 30 minutes. After letting it cool down to 45 °C, the mixture is inoculated with the lactobacillus and incubated for 6 to 7 days at 37 to 38 °C. After fermentation, water, sugar, gums and lactic acid are added.

Health claims 

In 2006, a panel appointed by the Netherlands Nutrition Center (Voedingscentrum) to evaluate a marketing request by Yakult found sufficient evidence to justify claims that drinking at least one bottle of Yakult per day might help improve bowel movements for people who tend to be constipated and might help maintain a healthy population of gut flora.

In 2010, a European Food Safety Authority (EFSA) panel denied a request by the company to market Yakult as defending the upper respiratory tract against pathogens (in other words, protection against diseases like the common cold), finding the claim not supported by the evidence.

In 2013, the UK Advertising Standards Authority disallowed an advertisement for Yakult in response to a complaint. It found that while there was sufficient evidence for the claim that "significant numbers of viable [Lactobacillus] survived transit to the gut [after consumption of Yakult]", the advertisement had made claims of general health benefits without providing a specific, referenced claim, as required.

Marketing history

Yakult was invented in 1935 in Japan by Minoru Shirota, who helped to found Yakult Honsha in order to commercialize it. Although Yakult is sold in Japan in supermarkets and convenience stores it is also sold door-to-door in Asia and in Latin America in convenience stores.

History
In 1930, Scientist Minoru Shirota strengthened and cultured the Lactobacillus casei shirota strain
In 1935, Yakult started being made in Japan.
In 1955, Yakult Honsha was founded.
In 1963, Yakult began a home delivery service, using 'Yakult lady' employees.
In 1964, Yakult began selling in other countries, beginning with Taiwan.
In 1968, Yakult opens its first factory outside Japan in the city of São Bernardo do Campo, Brazil.
In 1969, the Hong Kong Yakult Co Ltd was founded.
In 1969, Korea Yakult was founded in South Korea.
In 1981, Yakult ventured into Mexico, opening a factory in the city of Ixtapaluca under the direction of Carlos Kasuga.
In 1994, Yakult started being sold in Australia, Great Britain, and the United States.

Relationship with Danone
In February 2018, it was reported that Danone planned to sell US$1.9 billion of its Yakult investment, reducing its stake from 21% to 7%. The plan was followed by a decline in Yakult's share value. Danone had first bought shares in Yakult in April 2000. The sale was completed in March 2018.

In mass media
In September 2018, it was reported that the appearance of unlabelled Yakult bottles in the 2018 film To All the Boys I've Loved Before led to a rise in the drink's sales that coincided with a 2.8% increase in share price following the film's release on 17 August.

See also

 Actimel
 Calpis
 Fermented milk products
 List of fermented foods
 Tokyo Yakult Swallows

References

External links

 

Fermented dairy products
Japanese brands
Japanese drinks